Inglis is a local urban district in the Rural Municipality of Riding Mountain West, Manitoba, Canada.

Inglis is also the home of the Inglis Grain Elevators, a National Historic Site of Canada.

History 
Inglis was established as a village on 1 January 1956. On May 1, the Inglis and District Credit Union Society received their Charter of Incorporation.

The community was titled Inglis in the 1990s, named after Robert James Inglis a Scotsman from Montreal, Quebec, who supposedly tailored all of the uniforms for Canadian Pacific Railway. The name Inglis itself simply means 'English'.

Notable people
Del Barber, singer-songwriter

See also 
 Inglis elevator row
 Asessippi Ski Area
 Lake of the Prairies

References

External links 
Official site 

Local urban districts in Manitoba

Unincorporated communities in Parkland Region, Manitoba